Galatasaray SK Men's 1984–1985 season is the 1984–1985 basketball season for Turkish professional basketball club Galatasaray SK.

The club competes in:
Turkish Basketball League

Depth chart

Squad changes for the 1984–1985 season

In:

Out:

Results, schedules and standings

Turkish Basketball League 1984–85

Regular season

Pts=Points, Pld=Matches played, W=Matches won, L=Matches lost, F=Points for, A=Points against, D=Points difference
1st Half

2nd Half

Playoffs

Quarter-finals

Semi-finals

Finals

President Cup

References

Galatasaray S.K. (men's basketball) seasons
Galatasaray Sports Club 1984–85 season